Estadio IPD de Moyobamba is a multi-use stadium in Moyobamba, Peru.  It is currently used mostly for football matches and is the home stadium of Unión Comercio of the Peruvian Primera División.  The stadium holds 8,000 spectators. Renovations are expected to start on the stadium which would expand it to hold 20,000 spectators.

External links
Stadium information

IPD de Moyobamba
Buildings and structures in San Martín Region